WNHI (106.5 FM) is a Christian Worship formatted radio station. Licensed to Farmington, New Hampshire, the station's transmitter is located in New Durham, and studios are located in Rochester. The station serves the Portsmouth, New Hampshire area, and is currently owned by Educational Media Foundation.

The station signed on in 1999 with a deep oldies format as WZEN, competing with WQSO. WZEN adopted the WMEX letters shortly after they were dropped by what is now WQOM (1060 AM) in 2001. The WMEX call letters, which were also used during the 1980s on what is now WWDJ (1150 AM) in Boston as well as WCLX in Westport, NY in the Burlington, VT market, refer to a popular top-40 station of the 1960s and 1970s on 1510 AM in Boston, Massachusetts (which has since reclaimed the WMEX call sign). In 2005, the station adjusted to hot AC as "X106", but returned to a more mainstream oldies format as "106.5 WMEX".

On January 28, 2008, AllAccess.com reported that the station was in the process of being sold to the Educational Media Foundation for $1 million. When the sale was finalized, the station had been expected to change call letters and become the first New Hampshire affiliate of EMF's K-LOVE Christian contemporary music network.

On June 2, 2008, the station went out with the Righteous Brothers' "Rock n Roll Heaven" as its last tune. While the station changed its call letters to WKHL, implying that it would join K-LOVE, the station ended up joining sister network Air 1 instead. A few weeks later, the call sign was again changed, this time to the current WNHI.

The WMEX call sign was subsequently assigned to a construction permit for a station at 88.7 MHz in Edgartown, MA (now WMVY), and is now used on WMEX-LP (105.9 FM) in Rochester and WMEX (1510 AM) in Boston.

Personalities

Former Rochester, NH
Gary James - General Manager and WMEX Morning Personality from 2002–2008.
Gene Vallee - 2002 Sales Manager and a D.J. voice of WMEX
DJ Shadow Walker - On Air Personality from 2005– 2008

Former Burlington, VT
Dennis Jackson - 1994, Owner (station is now WCLX)

Former Boston
Gary James, Program Director of 1150/WMEX in Boston during the 1980s
Jack Armstrong - 1968
Larry Caringer - 1988
Jim Connors - Music Director & AM Drive Host, Early to mid 1970s aka:JC.
Mark Davis - 1969
Dan Donovan I - 1959 a.k.a. Johnny Dark
Dan Donovan II - 1960 a.k.a. Arthur Mctague
Dan Donovan III - 1965 a.k.a. Dan Donovan
Jack Gale - 1963
Arnie 'Woo-Woo' Ginsburg - 1959
Larry Glick - 1963
Jim Harrington - 1973
Bobby Holiday - 1967 a.k.a.Robert Stoehr
Johnny Lujack - 1967 a.k.a. Larry Lujack
Melvin X. Melvin - 1958 a.k.a. Tom Shovan
Maury Parent
Bill Rock - 1972, Now on Sirius Satellite Radio (Prime Country, '60s Vibrations, Elvis Radio)
Brad Shepard - 1987
Dick Summer - 1969
Charlie Tuna - 1967, Now at KRTH.
Little Walter - 1986
Jerry Williams - 1961
Rick Williams - 1972 a.k.a. Russ Oasis
J. Michael Wilson - 1972

References

External links

Air1 radio stations
Radio stations established in 1999
Strafford County, New Hampshire
1999 establishments in New Hampshire
Educational Media Foundation radio stations
NHI